Caradog ap Meirion (died ) was an 8th-century king of Gwynedd in northwest Wales.

This era in the history of Gwynedd was not notable and, given the lack of reliable information available, serious histories such that as by Davies do not mention Caradog or (like that of Lloyd) mention his name only in a footnote quoting the year of his death in the Annales Cambriae.

It is assumed Caradog rose to the throne upon the death of King Rhodri Molwynog, which Phillimore's reconstruction of the Annals of Wales dates to AD 754. However, there is no other basis for the date and, as the records are quite sparse in this era, intervening kings cannot be precluded. The sole references to Caradog in the historical record are the appearance of his name in genealogies such as those in Jesus College MS. 20, and the entry of his death in the Annales Cambriae (Phillimore's year 798), noting he was killed (lit. "throat-slit") by the Saxons (probably the Mercians).

It was during Caradog's reign that the Welsh church adopted the Catholic method of calculating Easter through the efforts of Bishop Elfodd in 768, thus removing a longstanding point of ecclesiastical contention. In 796, a battle occurred at Rhuddlan Marsh but neither the combatants nor the outcome is given. According to Brut Aberpergwm, a purported medieval Welsh text which was accepted as such by the editors of the Myvyrian Archaiology (but which is now known to a forgery of Iolo Morganwg's), Caradog was slain in the 796 battle. Thomas Stephens was the first to doubt the text's authenticity.

The pedigree in Jesus College MS. 20 states that the later King Hywel (reigned 816 – 825) was Caradog's son, while historical works such as that by Lloyd say that Hywel was the son of Caradog's predecessor and the brother of his successor, King Cynan (reigned 798 – 816). Lloyd does not cite his sources for this assertion.

References 

790s deaths
Monarchs of Gwynedd
8th-century Welsh monarchs
Year of birth unknown
Year of death uncertain